In China, regional expressways are a part of the country’s national highway system.
 Numbered: All expressways are ordered by number. 
 Unnumbered: All expressways are ordered by direction, starting from north or east.

Anhui 
Anhui Expressway Numbering Plan 2016-2030

All routes have two digits.
North-south routes end in odd numbers and are arranged in ascending order from east to west, numbered from 01 to 59.
East-west routes end in even numbers and are arranged in ascending order from north to south, numbered from 02 to 58.
Connecting routes begin with "6" and are arranged in ascending order from north to south.
Ring roads begin with "8" and are arranged in ascending order from north to south.
Branch lines begin with "9" and are arranged in ascending order from north to south.

 S8 was originally Mengbo Expressway (蒙亳高速)
 S22 was originally Tianqian Expressway (天潜高速)
 S24 was originally Changhe Expressway (常合高速)
 S36 was originally Xuandong Expressway (宣东高速)
 S0711 was originally Siwu Expressway (泗五高速)
 S1111 was originally Ningjing Expressway (宁旌高速)
 S2212 was originally Ninghe Expressway (宁和高速)

Beijing

Beijing-Tianjin-Hebei inter-provincial 

All route numbers are four digits and the first digit is always 3.
For radial routes: arranged in ascending order clockwise beginning at true north; the final digit is 1 (S3xx1).
For north–south routes: arranged in ascending order from east to west; the final digit is 5 (S3xx5).
For east–west routes: arranged in ascending order from north to south; the final digit is 0 (S3xx0).
No two routes can have the same number.

Chongqing

Fujian 

Fujian Expressway Numbering Plan 2009-2030  
Fujian Expressway Network Plan 2016-2030 

 S1522 was originally Pingtan Connecting Line (平潭连接线)
 S2525 was originally Sanming Connecting Line (三明连接线)

Gansu 
Gansu Provincial Road Network Planning (2013-2030)

Former numbers (before 2013):

  S1 Lanzhou-Yingpanguan / Lanying Expressway
 S2 Lanzhou-Langmusi / Lanlang Expressway
 S11 Qingcheng - Wuqi / Qingwu Expressway
 S13 Pingliang - Baoji / Pingbao Expressway
 S15 Pingliang - Wudu / Pingwu Expressway
 S10 Wuwei-Jinchang / Wujin Expressway
 S12 Baiyin-Zhongchuan Airport / Baizhong Expressway

Guangdong

Guangxi 
 North-south and east-west routes have numbers of 10-69, with odd numbers for north-south routes and even numbers for east-west routes.
 City ring routes have four digits, made of the main line number, the number "0" and a sequence number.
 Parallel routes have four digits, made of the main line number, the number "2" and a sequence number.
 Connecting routes have numbers of 70-89, arranged in order from north to south and east to west. A four digit number can also be used, and it consists of the main line number, the number "1", and a sequence number.
 Regional ring routes have numbers of 90-99.

Guizhou 

S04 was originally Bijie City Ring Expressway
S30 was originally Jiangzhi Expressway
S45 was originally Guiluo Expressway
S50 was originally Duxing Expressway
S55 was originally Chiwang Expressway
S81 was originally Suiyun Expressway
S82 was originally Qianda Expressway
S83 was originally Zhaqian Expressway
S84 was originally Tianweng Expressway
S85 was originally Duzhi Expressway
S87 was originally Daliu Expressway

Hainan

Hebei 
Hebei Expressway Numbering Plan 2013-2030
Hebei Expressway Network Plan 2016-2030

 S30 was originally Huangxing Expressway (黄邢高速)
 S51 was originally Qiancao Expressway (迁曹高速)
 S52 was originally Erqin Expressway (二秦高速)
 S53 was originally Tangqian Expressway (唐迁高速)
 S54 was originally Zhangshang Expressway (张尚高速)
 S55 was originally Kecheng Expressway (克承高速)
 S56 was originally Xuanda Expressway (宣大高速)
 S58 was originally Yuxian Liaison Line (蔚县联络线)
 S62 was originally Beidaihe Airport Expressway (北戴河机场高速)
 S65 was originally Jingba Expressway (京霸高速)
 S67 was originally Gucheng Liaison Line (故城联络线)
 S69 was originally Zhangxin Expressway (张辛高速) and later Anxin Expressway (安辛高速)
 S73 was originally Shizan Expressway (石赞高速)
 S74 was originally Jinxu Expressway (津徐高速)
 S76 was originally Dinghuang Expressway (定黄高速) and later Qugang Expressway (曲港高速)
 S9902 was originally Shijiazhuang Liaison Line (石家庄联络线)

Heilongjiang 
Heilongjiang Expressway Numbering Plan 2015-2030 

East-west routes have even numbers and north-south routes have odd numbers.

 S12 was originally Qianqi Expressway (前齐高速)

Henan 

Henan Expressway Numbering Plan 2015-2030 
Henan Expressway Network Plan 2016-2030

 S26 was originally Fanhui Expressway (范辉高速)
 S49 was originally Jiaotong Expressway (焦桐高速) and later Lintong Expressway (林桐高速) and Linru Expressway (林汝高速)
 S57 was originally Mianluan Expressway (渑栾高速)
 S62 was originally Huaixin Expressway (淮信高速) and later Guxin Expressway (固信高速)
 S81 was originally Shangzhou Expressway (商周高速)
 S85 was originally Zhengshaoluo Expressway (郑少洛高速) and later Zhenglu Expressway (郑卢高速)
 S86 was originally Yuanjiao Expressway (原焦高速) and later Lanjiao Expressway (兰焦高速) and Lanyuan Expressway (兰原高速)
 S88 was originally Wuxi Expressway (武西高速) and later Zhengxi Expressway (郑西高速)
 S92 was originally Xinhui Expressway (新辉高速)
 S99 was originally Qukou Expressway (渠口高速) and later Nankou Expressway (南口高速)

Hubei 
Radial routes are numbered in ascending order clockwise beginning from the north, and are numbered 1-20.
North-south routes are numbered in ascending order from east to west, have odd numbers, the second digit is 1, 3, or 9 and are numbered 29-93.
East-west routes are numbered in ascending order from north to south, have even numbers, the second digit is 4 or 8 and are numbered 28-88 (except 40).
Routes 21-27 are connecting or link routes.

Hunan

Inner Mongolia

Jiangsu 
Jiangsu Expressway Numbering Plan 2017-2035

 S35 was originally Taizhen Expressway (泰镇高速)
 S45 was originally Yihang Expressway (宜杭高速)
 S75 was originally Fuxingtai Branch Line (阜兴泰支线)
 S82 was originally Zhangjiaganggang Port Expressway (张家港港疏港高速)
 S83 was originally Wuxi Branch Line (无锡支线)
 S85 was originally Liyang Branch Line (溧阳支线)
 S92 was originally Jinhu Branch Line (金湖支线)

Jiangxi

Jilin 
Jilin Expressway Numbering Plan 2011-2030
Jilin Expressway Numbering Plan 2014-2030

Liaoning 
Liaoning Expressway List on Chinese Wiki

 S20 was originally Dengliao Expressway (灯辽高速)

Ningxia 
Ningxia Expressway Numbering Plan 2015-2030 

All numbers are two digits. North-south routes end in 0 and east-west routes end in 5.

Qinghai

Shaanxi

Shandong 
Shandong Expressway Numbering Plan 2009-2030   Shandong Expressway Network Plan 2015-2030

 S14 was originally Gaoxing Expressway (高邢高速)
 S21 was originally Xinwei Expressway (新潍高速)
 S27 was originally Huangzhan Expressway (黄沾高速)
 S29 was originally Binlai Expressway (滨莱高速)
 S31 was originally Taixin Expressway (泰新高速)
 S37 was originally Jiqi Expressway (济祁高速)

Shanghai 
Shanghai Expressway Numbering Plan 2009-2030

Shanxi 
Shanxi Expressway Numbering Plan 2009-2030 
Shanxi Expressway Network Plan 2012-2030

 S50 was originally Pinglin Expressway (平临高速)
 S60 was originally Yuqi Expressway (榆祁高速)
 S86 was originally Jinyang Expressway (晋阳高速)

Sichuan 
Sichuan Expressway Numbering Plan 2017-2030 

Radial routes are single digit, numbered in ascending order clockwise beginning north.
North-south routes are two-digit with odd numbers, numbered in ascending order from east to west.
East-west routes are two digits with even numbers, numbered in ascending order from north to south.
Ring roads have a letter identifying the city the route is located and a number identifying the sequence of routes from inside to outside. If there is only one ring road, the number is omitted.

 S2 was originally Chengbashaan Expressway (成巴陕高速)
 S8 was originally Chengqiongkang Expressway (成邛康高速)
 S41 was originally Neiyibi Expressway (内宜毕高速)
 S49 was originally Mianzhong Expressway (绵中高速)
 S53 was originally Maosui Expressway (茂遂高速)
 S63 was originally Puyizhao Expressway (蒲宜昭高速)
 S66 was originally Longle Expressway (隆乐高速)
 S67 was originally Lexi Expressway (乐西高速) and later Lepu Expressway (乐普高速)

Tianjin 

S51 was originally Jishan Expressway (蓟汕高速公路)

Tibet

Xinjiang 
Xinjiang Expressway Numbering Plan 2016-2030

Yunnan 

  S0501 Kunming Ring Expressway
North-South Lines:
 3. Renhe–Pu'er Expressway (SX5)
 4. Tonghai–Lüchun Expressway (SX5)
 6. Shangri-La–Jingdong Expressway (SX5)
 8. Deqen–Lujiang Expressway (SX5)

East-West Lines:
 1. Anning–Houqiao Expressway (SX0)
 4. Tianlian–Malong Expressway (SX0)
 6. Jinshuihe–Shuangpai Expressway (SX0)

Connecting Lines:
 1. Shuifu–Suijiang Expressway (SX1)
 6. Pingyuan–Wenshan Expressway (SX6)

Zhejiang 
Zhejiang Expressway Numbering Plan 2010-2030
Lishui Expressway Plan 2014-2030

 S6 was originally Daizhu Expressway (岱朱高速)
 S9 was originally Sushao Expressway (苏绍高速)
 S34 was originally Liwen Expressway (丽温高速)

Hong Kong and Macau 

For more see Expressways in Hong Kong and Highways in Macau.

See also 

 Expressways of China
 List of primary NTHS Expressways
 List of auxiliary NTHS Expressways

References 

Regional
China
Regional expressways
Regional Expressways